Puerto Castilla may refer to:
 Puerto Castilla, Honduras
 Puerto Castilla, Spain